Journal of Consumer Culture is a peer-reviewed academic journal that covers the field of sociology, specifically research on consumption and consumer culture. The journal's editor-in-chief is Steven Miles. It was established in 2001 and is currently published by SAGE Publications.

Abstracting and indexing 
Journal of Consumer Culture is abstracted and indexed in Scopus and the Social Sciences Citation Index. According to the Journal Citation Reports, its 2019 impact factor is 1.670.

References 

3. Source: 2010 Journal Citation Reports® (Clarivate Analytics, 2020)

External links 
 

SAGE Publishing academic journals
English-language journals
Sociology journals